Nicolas Lourdaux (born 8 December 1955) is a French rower. He competed in the men's coxless four event at the 1980 Summer Olympics.

References

1955 births
Living people
French male rowers
Olympic rowers of France
Rowers at the 1980 Summer Olympics
Place of birth missing (living people)